Zhao Xin (born 31 December 1992) is a Chinese speed-skater.

Zhao competed at the 2014 Winter Olympics for China. In the 1500 metres she placed 34th.

As of September 2014, Zhao's best performance at the World Allround Speed Skating Championships is 13th, in 2014.

Zhao made her World Cup debut in November 2012. As of September 2014, Zhao's top World Cup finish is 12th in a mass start race at Kolomna in 2012–13. Her best overall finish in the World Cup is 28th, in the 2012–13 mass start.

References

External links 
 

1992 births
Living people
Chinese female speed skaters
Speed skaters at the 2014 Winter Olympics
Olympic speed skaters of China
Sportspeople from Jilin City
Speed skaters at the 2017 Asian Winter Games
Asian Games medalists in speed skating
Asian Games bronze medalists for China
Medalists at the 2017 Asian Winter Games
20th-century Chinese women
21st-century Chinese women